Arnold Sterling (March 2, 1938 - November 28, 2015) was a Baltimore, Maryland-based player of the saxophone (soprano, alto and tenor), and a prominent part of the Baltimore jazz scene. He toured with Jackie Wilson in the late 1950s, then worked with organist Bill Byrd in Baltimore. In the 1980s, he toured and recorded with organist Jimmy McGriff, and later in the decade with other organists Percy Smith and Don Patterson. In 2002, he recorded with blues singer Nap Turner.

Discography

As leader
 Here's Brother Sterling (JAM, 1982)

As sideman
With Jimmy McGriff
 Movin' Upside the Blues (JAM, 1982)
 The Groover (JAM, 1982)
 Countdown (Milestone, 1983)
 Skywalk (Milestone, 1984)
With [(Nap "Don't Forget the Blues" Turner)

Live At Cada Vez (Right on Rhythm/Folkways, 2002)

References

 Baltimore Jazz
 

American jazz alto saxophonists
American male saxophonists
Musicians from Baltimore
1938 births
2015 deaths
Jazz musicians from Maryland
American male jazz musicians
20th-century American saxophonists